Pat Conner is a former member of the Arizona State Senate. He served a single term in the Senate from January 1997 through January 1999, representing district 5.  He did not run for re-election in 2000.

References

Republican Party Arizona state senators